Tara O'Toole served as the Under Secretary of Homeland Security for Science and Technology from 2009 to 2013. She is currently a senior fellow and executive vice president at In-Q-Tel.

Background
Prior to her confirmation as Under Secretary (November 4, 2009), O'Toole founded, and served as chief executive officer and director of, the Center for Biosecurity at the University of Pittsburgh Medical Center. Concurrently, she was a Professor of Medicine and of Public Health at the University of Pittsburgh.  She stepped down from her position as Under Secretary on September 23, 2013

From 2006 to 2007, she chaired the board of the Federation of American Scientists. In 2006, she was appointed to the board of the Google Foundation's International Networked System for Total Early Disease Detection. From 2001 to 2003, she directed the Johns Hopkins Center for Civilian Biodefense Strategies. From 1993 to 1997, she served as the Assistant Secretary for Environment Safety and Health in the Department of Energy. From 1984 to 1988, she practiced general internal medicine in community health centers in Baltimore.

Disaster response exercises
O'Toole is best known for her disaster response exercises. She was a principal author and producer of Dark Winter (2001) and Atlantic Storm (2005), both of which simulated a covert outbreak of smallpox in the United States. Many experts applauded these exercises for publicizing the country's surprising vulnerabilities, including a vaccine shortage. Critics charged that these exercises exaggerated the bioterror threat, leading to an unnecessary increase in the number of research labs.

In her nomination hearing, O'Toole said that this controversy stemmed from her estimated "secondary transmission rate"; that is, the number of smallpox infections caused as a result of the initial infections. O'Toole claimed that her rate of 10 derived from "the available empirical data" and coincided with data from a 2001 article in the peer-reviewed journal, Nature.

Education
O'Toole holds a bachelor's degree from Vassar College, an MD from George Washington University, and a Master of Public Health degree from Johns Hopkins University.

References

External links
 Official biography
 Congressional testimony for nomination as Under Secretary
 WhoRunsGov.com profile
 

George Washington University School of Medicine & Health Sciences alumni
Johns Hopkins University alumni
Living people
Physicians from Maryland
United States Department of Homeland Security officials
University of Pittsburgh faculty
Vassar College alumni
Year of birth missing (living people)